Kulandeshwara Temple, located  in the Chittoor district of Andhra Pradesh, India. It is dedicated to the deity Kulandeshwara (the Hindu god Shiva). It  dates back to the 11th century. It is located in Kattamanchi.  Chola Period.

Reference lists 

Hindu temples in Chittoor district
Shiva temples in Andhra Pradesh
12th-century Hindu temples